His and Hers is a 1961 British comedy film directed by Brian Desmond Hurst and starring Terry-Thomas, Janette Scott and Wilfrid Hyde-White. The film follows an eccentric author who tries to impose his lifestyle on his reluctant wife.

Plot
While researching his latest novel "I Conquered the Desert" in North Africa, Reggie Blake (Terry-Thomas) finds himself lost in the desert. Rescued by a Bedouin tribe, and finally shipped home, Reggie enthusiastically adopts Bedouin dress and customs, much to the frustration of his wife  (Janette Scott).  Fran declares herself unable to live with him, so they split their home down the middle. There is further drama when Reggie's publisher (Wilfrid Hyde-White) rejects his new novel out of hand.

Cast
 Terry-Thomas as Reggie Blake
 Janette Scott as Fran Blake
 Wilfrid Hyde-White as Charles Dunton
 Nicole Maurey as Simone Rolfe
 Joan Sims as Hortense
 Kenneth Connor as Harold
 Meier Tzelniker as Felix McGregor
 Joan Hickson as Phoebe
 Oliver Reed as Poet
 Francesca Annis as Wanda
 Dorinda Stevens as Dora
 Kenneth Williams as Policeman
 Barbara Hicks as Woman
 Billy Lambert as Baby
 Colin Gordon as Television announcer
 Marie Devereux as Wife

References

External links

1960 films
1960 comedy films
Films shot at Associated British Studios
1960s English-language films
Films directed by Brian Desmond Hurst
British comedy films
Films scored by John Addison
1961 comedy films
1961 films
Films with screenplays by Stanley Mann
1960s British films